Yi Fuxian (易富贤) is a obstetrics and gynecology researcher at the University of Wisconsin-Madison and author of Big Country with an Empty Nest, which criticised China birth policies and was banned in mainland China until 2013.

References  
 

Chinese medical researchers
University of Wisconsin–Madison staff
Living people
Year of birth missing (living people)
Place of birth missing (living people)
Chinese expatriates in the United States
Chinese obstetricians
American medical researchers
Expatriate academics in the United States